Christoph Zuercher is Professor at the Graduate School of Public and International Affairs at the University of Ottawa, where he has been since 2008. He used to be a professor of Political Science at the Free University in Berlin. He was also a Humboldt fellow at the Center on Democracy, Development and the Role of Law at Stanford University.

References

Academic staff of the Free University of Berlin
Political science educators
Living people
Stanford University fellows
Year of birth missing (living people)